Wolfgang Kraushaar (born 2 September 1948) is a political scientist and historian. After a residency at the Hamburger Institut für Sozialforschung from the 1980s until 2015. In 2015 he continued his research at the Hamburg Foundation for the Promotion of Science and Culture also in Hamburg, Germany.

Kraushaar grew up in the German village of Niederruf in Germany. After finishing the König-Heinrich-Schule in Fritzlar, Germany, in 1968 he studied political sciences, philosophy and German studies in Frankfurt. From 1974 to 1975 he was the chairman of AStA and took a residency at the Hamburger Institut für Sozialforschung since 1987. In 2015 he continued his work at the Hamburg Foundation for the Promotion of Science and Culture in Hamburg, Germany. He focuses on the analysis of protest and political opposition in the Federal Republic of Germany and the German Democratic Republic during the period from 1949 to 1990, especially the protests of 1968, the Red Army Faction and K-Gruppen. He furthermore maintains a focus on national and international protest movements, totalitarianism and extremism, pop-culture and modern media.

Publications (extract)
 Die Revolution der 68er – was war links?, in: Robertson-von Trotha, Caroline Y. (ed.): Herausforderung Demokratie. Demokratisch, parlamentarisch, gut? (= Kulturwissenschaft interdisziplinär/Interdisciplinary Studies on Culture and Society, Vol. 6), Baden-Baden 2011. 
 Die RAF und der linke Terrorismus. Hamburger Edition, Hamburg 2006.
 Die Bombe im Jüdischen Gemeindehaus. Hamburger Edition, Hamburg 2005. 
 Fischer in Frankfurt. Karriere eines Außenseiters. Hamburger Edition, Hamburg 2001. 
 Linke Geisterfahrer - Denkanstöße für eine antitotalitäre Linke. Verlag Neue Kritik, Frankfurt 2001. 
 1968 als Mythos, Chiffre und Zäsur. Hamburger Edition, Hamburg 2000. 
 1968 - Das Jahr, das alles verändert hat. Piper, München 1998.
 Frankfurter Schule und Studentenbewegung - Von der Flaschenpost zum Molotowcocktail. Bd. I-III. Rogner & Bernhard, Hamburg 1998.
 Die Protest-Chronik 1949-1959 - Eine illustrierte Geschichte von Bewegung, Widerstand und Utopie. Bd. I-IV. Rogner & Bernhard bei Zweitausendeins, Hamburg 1996.
 (als Hrsg.): Frankfurter Schule und Studentenbewegung. Von der Flaschenpost zum Molotowcocktail. 3 Bände. Rogner & Bernhard, Hamburg 1998, .
 1968 – Das Jahr, das alles verändert hat. Piper, München 1998, .
 1968 als Mythos, Chiffre und Zäsur. Hamburger Edition, Hamburg 2000, .
 Linke Geisterfahrer. Denkanstöße für eine antitotalitäre Linke. Neue Kritik, Frankfurt 2001, .
 Fischer in Frankfurt. Karriere eines Außenseiters. Hamburger Edition, Hamburg 2001, .
 (zusammen mit Karin Wieland und Jan Philipp Reemtsma): Rudi Dutschke, Andreas Baader und die RAF. Hamburger Edition, Hamburg 2005, .
 Die Bombe im Jüdischen Gemeindehaus. Hamburger Edition, Hamburg 2005. . (Über den versuchten Anschlag auf das Jüdische Gemeindehaus in Berlin am 9. November 1969 durch die Gruppe Tupamaros West-Berlin um Dieter Kunzelmann.)
 (als Hrsg.): Die RAF und der linke Terrorismus. 2 Bände. Hamburger Edition, Hamburg 2006, .
 Achtundsechzig. Eine Bilanz. Propyläen, Berlin 2008, . 
 Verena Becker und der Verfassungsschutz. Hamburger Edition, Hamburg 2010, .
 Der Aufruhr der Ausgebildeten: Vom Arabischen Frühling zu den weltweiten Anti-Banken-Protesten: Vom Arabischen Frühling zur Occupy-Bewegung. Hamburger Edition, Hamburg 2012, .
 Der Griff nach der Notbremse – Nahaufnahmen des Protests. Wagenbach, Berlin 2012, .
 „Wann endlich beginnt bei Euch der Kampf gegen die heilige Kuh Israel?“ München 1970: über die antisemitischen Wurzeln des deutschen Terrorismus. Rowohlt, Reinbek 2013, .
 Die blinden Flecken der RAF. Stuttgart 2017, .
 Die Blinden Flecken der RAF, Sonderausgabe, Bundeszentrale für politische Bildung, Bonn, 2018
 1968. Hundert Seiten, Ditzingen 2018,
 Die blinden Flecken der 68er-Bewegung, Stuttgart 2018, 
 Die 68er-Bewegung international - Eine illustrierte Chronik 1960-1969'',Bd I-IV, Stuttgart 2018, .

References

External links 
Wolfgang Kraushaar online

1948 births
Living people
German political scientists
20th-century German historians
Sozialistischer Deutscher Studentenbund members
German male non-fiction writers
21st-century German historians